Jacob Michael Smolinski (born February 9, 1989) is an American former professional baseball left fielder. He played in Major League Baseball (MLB) for the Texas Rangers and Oakland Athletics, and in the KBO League for the NC Dinos.

Amateur career
Born and raised in Rockford, Illinois, Smolinski attended Boylan Catholic High School where he also starred in football as a quarterback. In baseball, Smolinski was a shortstop and pitcher. As a senior, Smolinski batted .441 with 13 home runs and 49 RBIs.

Professional career

Washington Nationals
Smolinski was drafted as a left fielder and third baseman by the Washington Nationals in the second round of the 2007 Major League Baseball Draft, out of high school.

Florida Marlins
On November 10, 2008, he was traded to the Florida Marlins along with Emilio Bonifacio and P. J. Dean for Josh Willingham and Scott Olsen.

Texas Rangers
He signed a minor league deal with the Texas Rangers in December 2013. Smolinski was called up to the majors for the first time on July 7, 2014.

Oakland Athletics
Smolinski was claimed off waivers by the Oakland Athletics on June 21, 2015. He declared free agency on October 15, 2018.

Tampa Bay Rays
On November 15, 2018, Smolinski signed a minor-league contract with the Tampa Bay Rays. On July 2, 2019, Smolinski was granted a release from Triple-A Durham to pursue  options in Korea.

NC Dinos
On July 2, 2019, Smolinski signed with the NC Dinos of the KBO League. He became a free agent following the season.

References

External links

1989 births
Living people
Sportspeople from Rockford, Illinois
Baseball players from Illinois
Major League Baseball left fielders
Texas Rangers players
Oakland Athletics players
Gulf Coast Nationals players
Vermont Lake Monsters players
Hagerstown Suns players
Greensboro Grasshoppers players
Jupiter Hammerheads players
Jacksonville Suns players
Gulf Coast Marlins players
New Orleans Zephyrs players
Frisco RoughRiders players
Round Rock Express players
Nashville Sounds players
Durham Bulls players
American expatriate baseball players in South Korea
NC Dinos players
Yaquis de Obregón players
American expatriate baseball players in Mexico
Stockton Ports players